Johann Adam Otto Bütschli (3 May 1848 – 2 February 1920) was a German zoologist and professor at the University of Heidelberg. He specialized in invertebrates and insect development. Many of the groups of protists were first recognized by him.

He was the first scientist to recognize the structures now known as chromosomes.

Life

Bütschli was born Frankfurt am Main. He studied mineralogy, chemistry, and paleontology in Karlsruhe and became assistant of Karl Alfred von Zittel (geology and paleontology). He moved to Heidelberg in 1866 and worked with Robert Bunsen (chemistry). He received his PhD from the University of Heidelberg in 1868, after passing examinations in geology, paleontology, and zoology. He joined Rudolf Leuckart at the University of Leipzig in 1869. After leaving his studies to serve as an officer in the Franco-Prussian War (1870–1871), Bütschli worked in his private laboratory and then for two years (1873–1874) with Karl Möbius at the University of Kiel. After that, he worked privately. In 1876, he made Habilitation. He became professor at the University of Heidelberg, as successor of Alexander Pagenstecher, in 1878. He held this position for over 40 years.

References

Further reading

 Fokin, Sergei I. (2013). "Otto Bütschli (1848–1920): Where we will genuflect?" Protistology, 8 (1), 22–35.
Goldschmidt, R. B. 1966 The Golden Age of Zoology. Portraits from Memory. Seattle and London, University of Washington Press.

Hoffmann, D., Laitko, H., Müller-Wille, S. and Jahn, Ilse, eds. 2003 Lexikon der bedeutenden Naturwissenschaftler. In drei Bänden. Heidelberg, Berlin Spektrum Akademischer Verlag 1 (A-E).

External links
 

1848 births
1920 deaths
19th-century German botanists
German entomologists
19th-century German zoologists
German microbiologists
German parasitologists
Protistologists
German science writers
Academic staff of Heidelberg University
Karlsruhe Institute of Technology alumni
Academic staff of the University of Kiel
Heidelberg University alumni
Academic staff of Leipzig University
Members of the Göttingen Academy of Sciences and Humanities